The Gambia competed at the 2018 Commonwealth Games in the Gold Coast, Australia from April 4 to April 15, 2018. It was The Gambia's 11th appearance at the Commonwealth Games.

Competitors

The following is the list of number of competitors participating at the Games per sport/discipline.

Athletics

The Gambia participated with 6 athletes (4 men and 2 women).

Men
Track & road events

Women
Track & road events

See also

Gambia at the 2018 Summer Youth Olympics

References

Nations at the 2018 Commonwealth Games
The Gambia at the Commonwealth Games
Com